Rank comparison chart of Non-commissioned officer and enlisted ranks for air forces of Arabophone states.

Other ranks

References

Military comparisons